Nell Eivor Kristina Sjöström (later Svensson, then Ersson, 12 March 1933 – 5 September 2021) was a Swedish sprinter. She competed at the 1952 Summer Olympics in the 100 m and 4 × 100 m relay events, but failed to reach the finals. In 1952 she set Swedish records in the 60 m at 7.7 seconds and in the 80 m at 9.9 seconds.

Sjöström died on 5 September 2021, at the age of 88.

References

1933 births
2021 deaths
Athletes (track and field) at the 1952 Summer Olympics
Olympic athletes of Sweden
Olympic female sprinters
Swedish female sprinters
People from Sandviken Municipality
Sportspeople from Gävleborg County